Louis III, Grand Duke of Hesse and by Rhine (9 June 1806, Darmstadt – 13 June 1877, Seeheim) was Grand Duke of Hesse and by Rhine from 1848 until his death in 1877.

Biography 

He was the son of Grand Duke Louis II of Hesse and his consort, Princess Wilhelmine of Baden. He succeeded as Grand Duke in 1848 upon the abdication of his father during the March Revolution in the German states.

During the Austro-Prussian War of 1866, Louis sent word more than once to Queen Victoria, mother-in-law of his nephew and successor Louis, appealing to her to reason on his behalf with the King of Prussia, "in the same sense I had already written before, but it would be utterly useless."

He was succeeded by his nephew, Louis IV, on 13 June 1877, as his brother Charles (Louis' father) had already died three months previously, in March.

Marriages 
In Munich, on 26 December 1833, he married Princess Mathilde Caroline of Bavaria, eldest daughter of Ludwig I of Bavaria. The marriage produced no children.  Princess Mathilde Caroline died in 1862, and in 1868 the Grand Duke remarried, morganatically, to Magdalene Appel who was created Baroness of Hochstädten.

Honours and awards

Ancestry

References

External links

 Royal Genealogies Part 46
 World Roots

1806 births
1877 deaths
Nobility from Darmstadt
Hereditary Grand Dukes of Hesse
Recipients of the Order of St. George of the Third Degree
Grand Crosses of the Order of Saint Stephen of Hungary
Grand Crosses of the Order of Saint-Charles
Knights of the Golden Fleece of Spain
Extra Knights Companion of the Garter
Burials at the Mausoleum for the Grand Ducal House of Hesse, Rosenhöhe (Darmstadt)